Udea ommatias is a moth of the family Crambidae. It is endemic to the Hawaiian islands of Kauai, Oahu and Molokai.

The larvae feed on Dubautia laxa and Dubautia plantaginea.

External links

Moths described in 1899
Endemic moths of Hawaii
ommatias